Hemileuca griffini, known generally as the Griffin's sheepmoth or Canadian fleabane moth, is a species of insect in the family Saturniidae. It is found in North America.

The MONA or Hodges number for Hemileuca griffini is 7740.

References

Further reading

 
 
 

Hemileucinae
Articles created by Qbugbot
Moths described in 1978